Dugas may refer to:

 May Dugas de Pallandt van Eerde (1869–1937), Baroness and conwoman
 Firmin Dugas (1830–1889), businessman and politician
 Francis Dugas (1919–2008), Louisiana politician
 François Octave Dugas (1852–1918), politician
 Gaëtan Dugas (1953–1984), AIDS victim
 Gus Dugas (1907–1997), baseball player
 Jean-Baptiste Dugas-Montbel, translator
 Jeanne Dugas (1731–1817), Acadian woman
 Joseph Louis Euclide Dugas (1861–1943), farmer and politician
 Lucien Dugas (1897–1985), educator, lawyer and politician
 Martin Dugas (born 1972), soccer player
 Richard Dugas Jr. (born 1965), businessman
 Taylor Dugas (born 1989), American baseball player
 William Dugas (1809–unknown), millwright and politician

See also
 Dugas, New Brunswick